GWCC/CNN Center station is a rail station in Atlanta, Georgia, on the Blue and Green lines of the Metropolitan Atlanta Rapid Transit Authority (MARTA) rail system. Located on the western edge of Downtown Atlanta, the station officially opened on December 22, 1979. It was originally called Omni station due to its proximity to the Omni Coliseum, which was demolished to build Philips Arena (now State Farm Arena).  The station's name expanded in 1992 as Omni/Dome/World Congress Center (or simply Omni/Dome/GWCC) with that year's opening of the Georgia Dome as well as the Georgia World Congress Center (opened 1976).  By the year 2000, the station name had changed to Dome/GWCC/Philips Arena/CNN Center. In June 2019, MARTA held a town hall to gather community input on a new name for the station after the demolition of the Georgia Dome and the renaming of Philips Arena to State Farm Arena. The station was one of five MARTA rail stations that were under consideration for new names in 2019. The name of the station was changed to GWCC/CNN Center.

The station provides service to Mercedes-Benz Stadium (replacing the now-razed Georgia Dome), the Georgia World Congress Center, State Farm Arena, and the CNN Center. Access is also provided to the Omni and Glenn hotels, Centennial Olympic Park, the Georgia Aquarium, the College Football Hall of Fame, the National Center for Civil and Human Rights, Centennial Tower, and the World of Coca-Cola at Pemberton Place.

Station layout

References

External links 

MARTA Station Page
nycsubway.org Atlanta page
 Centennial Olympic Park Drive entrance from Google Maps Street View

Blue Line (MARTA)
Green Line (MARTA)
Metropolitan Atlanta Rapid Transit Authority stations
CNN
Railway stations in the United States opened in 1979
Railway stations in Atlanta
1979 establishments in the United States